The State Bank and Savings Bank, also known by its Luxemburgish name Spuerkeess, is the leading national financial institution founded in 1856 and governed by the law of March 24, 1989. Spuerkeess is a commercial bank wholly owned by the government of Luxembourg.

Nowadays, it provides all the functions of a commercial bank, including retail banking and private banking. In terms of total assets Spuerkeess is the third-largest bank in Luxembourg and the largest bank with domestic capital.

History 
Spuerkees was founded by Grand Duke William III as "Caisse d'Épargne de l'État du Grand-Duché de Luxembourg" due to a Law on February 21, 1856. The board of directors had three members and had their first meeting on August 18, 1859 under the presidency of Professor Nicolas Martha. Headquarters of the Spuerkeess at that time were seated in Haus Ketter in Dräikinneksgaass in the city, while their desk offices were at the Krautmaart, at the headquarters of the government commission, which is today's Palais.

Since its foundation in 1856, Banque et Caisse d’Épargne de l’État, Luxembourg (Spuerkeess) has been solely owned by the Luxembourg State. The statutory missions of the Bank consist in promoting savings, facilitating access to housing and supporting the development of the national economy.

Since 1862 it was allowed that foreigners could deposit their money at the Spuerkeess. The trust of the public was high from the first day on, one of the reasons the deposit already reached an amount of one million francs in 1869.

Awards 
The international rating agencies have awarded Spuerkeess AA+ (Standard & Poor's) and Aa2 (Long term Deposit Rating, Moody's) ratings.

The magazine Global Finance ranks Spuerkeess among the safest banks in the world and has recognised it for many years with the "Safest Bank Award - Luxembourg". 

In 2020, the magazines The Banker and Global Finance named Spuerkeess "Bank of the Year 2020 - Luxembourg" and "Best Bank 2020 - Luxembourg" respectively.

 "Partner Luxembourg E-Commerce" 2005 by the Chambre de Commerce en collaboration avec le CRP Henri Tudor et le soutien du Ministère de l'Economie et du commerce extérieur;
 "Prix Santé et Entreprises – Luxembourg" 2006 / 2009 by the Club Européen pour la Santé;
 "Grand Prix Paperjam RH" 2010 for its project Programme d'accueil et d'intégration Pool GDP;
 "Entreprise Socialement Responsable – ESR" 2012/2015 by Institut National pour le Développement Durable et la Responsabilité des Entreprises;
 "Green Facility Management Award 2013" and "Green Finance Award 2014".

See also
 List of banks in Luxembourg

References

External links

 

Banks of Luxembourg
Government-owned companies of Luxembourg
Companies based in Luxembourg City
Banks established in 1856
Banks under direct supervision of the European Central Bank